Treasure Island, formerly The Treasury, was a chain of discount stores owned by J.C. Penney. Through an acquisition of the General Merchandise Company in 1962, J.C. Penney entered the discount department store market by launching The Treasury.

The General Merchandise Company, which began as Treasure Island, was founded by David Kritzik and his two sons, Robert and Stanley, in Milwaukee, Wisconsin. The original stores were named Treasure Island, but because of trademark and copyright conflicts, some of the stores that were subsequently opened were called The Treasury. The only exceptions in this case were around Milwaukee and Appleton, Wisconsin and Atlanta, Georgia, which retained the Treasure Island name.  In 1962, J.C. Penney was looking to break into the catalog business, and used their acquisition of the Treasure Island brand name to do so.

Eventually the Treasury had locations in most Southern U.S. states, California and the Milwaukee area.  Some stores also sold food and fuel, like the Wal-Mart Supercenters of today.  But the recessions of the 1970s and early 1980s were too much to bear for J.C. Penney, and the discount division started losing money.  The Treasury stores were eventually closed in 1981. However, the mail order business, which was the main reason for J.C. Penney's acquisition of Treasure Island, remains a thriving, multibillion-dollar endeavor.

The roof architecture of The Treasury and Treasure Island stores was unique, having a zig-zag pattern that was very prominent both inside and outside.  This is reflected in the store logo.  The original advertising slogan referred to the stores as "Under the squiggly roof."  In 1979, The Home Depot chain subsequently launched its first four stores in these former Treasure Island storefronts (which it shared with Zayre) around the Atlanta area, as the home improvement chain was beginning around the same time that many Treasure Island stores were already closing.

Treasury Drug
The company branched out into drug stores, located in many Southern states, as Treasury Drug. Treasury Drug survived into the 1990s when J.C. Penney acquired Eckerd and converted remaining Treasury Drug locations into Eckerd stores.  J.C. Penney sold the Eckerd chain to CVS and Jean Coutu Group of Canada in 2004. CVS got roughly 1,200 Eckerd stores in the Southern United States, while Jean Coutu Group got approximately 1,500 Eckerd stores in the Northeastern United States. In 2007, all the remaining Eckerd stores were sold to Rite Aid and rebranded.

References

Defunct discount stores of the United States
Retail companies established in 1962
Retail companies disestablished in 1981
JCPenney
1962 establishments in Wisconsin
1981 disestablishments in Wisconsin
Health care companies based in Wisconsin